The 1978–79 Alabama Crimson Tide men's basketball team represented the University of Alabama in the 1978–79 NCAA Division I men's basketball season. The team's head coach was C.M. Newton, who was in his eleventh season at Alabama. The team played their home games at Coleman Coliseum in Tuscaloosa, Alabama. They finished the season 22–11, 11–7 in SEC play.

The Tide reached the second round of the inaugural 1979 SEC men's basketball tournament, where they lost to Kentucky 100–101.  Afterwards, the Tide accepted a bid to the 1979 National Invitation Tournament and reached the semi-final where they lost to Purdue University.

Roster

References 

Alabama Crimson Tide men's basketball seasons
Alabama
Alabama
Crimson Tide men's basketball team
Crimson Tide men's basketball team